Huancavelica is a department and region in Peru with an area of  and a population of 347,639 (2017 census). The capital is the city Huancavelica. The region is bordered by the departments of Lima and Ica in the west, Junín in the north, and Ayacucho in the east.

Political division

The department is divided into seven provinces.

Province (Capital)
 Acobamba Province (Acobamba)
 Angaraes Province (Lircay)
 Castrovirreyna Province (Castrovirreyna)
 Churcampa Province (Churcampa)
 Huancavelica Province (Huancavelica)
 Huaytará Province (Huaytará)
 Tayacaja Province (Pampas)

The main cities are Huancavelica, Pampas and Lircay. There are many little districts like Querco in Huancavelica. Querco is a nice little town. Most of the residents are agricultors. They own cattle, sheep, pigs, horses, mules, llamas, goats, chickens, and donkeys.

Demographics 
The region is mostly inhabited by indigenous people of Quechua descent.

Languages 
According to the 2007 Peru Census, the language learnt first by most of the residents was Quechua (64.03%) followed by Spanish (35.67%). The Quechua variety spoken in Huancavelica is Chanka Quechua. The following table shows the results concerning the language learnt first in the department of Huancavelica by province:

Education

The National University of Huancavelica is the only university in the region and it has branches in Pampas, Lircay, Acobamba and Castrovirreyna.

Health 
The region has two hospitals located in Huancavelica and Pampas. There are clinics and medical post in most of the towns.

Transportation

The region is connected with the neighboring regions by national roads, which are paved in most cases. There are regional and local roads that are serving the towns of the regions. Huancavelica has a train service with the city of Huancayo.

Notable natives
 Lina Medina, world's youngest mother

Authorities 
 Governor: Rubén Alva Ochoa (2015–2018)

See also 
 Aknuqucha
 Chunta mountain range
 Chuqlluqucha
 Inka Wasi
 Urququcha
 Warmiqucha

Sources

External links 

Official regional site
Official municipal site

 
Huancavelica